The Lewis School of Princeton, located in Princeton, New Jersey, United States, serves students who have learning difficulties (dyslexia, dyscalculia, dysgraphia, delayed auditory and visual processing, and nonverbal learning issues). The school provides pre K-12 and college-preparatory education. The clinic functions as the diagnostic, language and learning performance unit of the facility.

History

The school was founded in 1973 by Marsha Gaynor Lewis as a tutorial school and educational diagnostic facility. At that time many educators denied the existence of dyslexia. The school's continuing mission has been to help those students who are underserved in their mainstream education. The school has been consulted by clinicians from such notable facilities as Jefferson Memorial Hospital Clinic and the University of Pennsylvania in the areas of multi-sensory instruction and language based learning differences.

The school is housed in the historic Princeton mansion, Thanet Lodge, also known as Greenholm or the William Libbey house after the noted Princeton University archaeologist who built it in 1902.  After Libbey's death the mansion was home to Miss Mason's School, a private elementary school, from the 1930s to 1982.

References

External links

1973 establishments in New Jersey
Learning disabilities
Dyslexia
Educational institutions established in 1973
Buildings and structures in Princeton, New Jersey
Schools in Princeton, New Jersey
Private elementary schools in New Jersey
Private middle schools in New Jersey
Private high schools in Mercer County, New Jersey
Historic district contributing properties in Mercer County, New Jersey